Galați is a county (județ) of Romania, in Moldavia region, with the capital city at Galați.

History
Historically Galați is part of Moldavia.  In 1858, it was represented by Alexandru Ioan Cuza at the ad hoc Divan at Iași, in the wake of the Crimean War.
Prior to 1938 what is now eastern Galați was the separate Covurlui County (Județul Covurlui).
From 1938 to 1945 Galați was part of Ținutul Dunării (Megacounty Dunării).

2010 Romanian floods
During July 2010, the River Siret threatened to break through the dykes protecting the town of Șendreni, as locals and emergency services reinforced the dykes with sandbags trucks full of earth to prevent the river breaking out and flooding the town.

Demographics 

In 2011, it had a population of 536,167 and the population density was 120/km2.

 Romanians – over 98%
 Russians, Ukrainians, and Romani –  2%

Geography 

This county has a total area of 4,466 km2.

The county lies on a low plain, between the Prut River in the East, the Siret River in the West and South-West.  They both flow into the Danube which forms the border with Tulcea County in the South-East.

Neighbours 

 Republic of Moldova in the East – Cahul raion.
 Vrancea County in the West.
 Vaslui County in the North.
 Brăila County and Tulcea County in the South.

Economy 
Due to the relief, the majority of the population in the rural areas work in agriculture.  Fishing is another profitable occupation along the Danube and the Siret River.  Galați is Romania's second harbour after Constanța, the navigable channel on the Danube allowing the passage of large ships.  In Galați there exist the biggest metallurgical complex in Romania – the Mittal-Sidex Complex.  Also the second biggest shipyard can be found also at Galați allowing ships up to 55,000 tdw to be built.

The predominant industries in the county are:
 Metallurgy – 55% of Romania's steel production.
 Food industry.
 Textile industry.
 Ship building industry.

The county of Galați is also an important transport hub.

Tourism 
The main tourist destinations are:

 The larger town of Galați;
 Lake Brateș;
 The small town of Tecuci.

Politics 

The Galați County Council, renewed at the 2020 local elections, consists of 34 counsellors, with the following party composition:

Administrative divisions

Galați County has 2 municipalities, 2 towns and 61 communes
Municipalities
Galați – capital city; population: 249,432 (as of 2011)
Tecuci
Towns
Berești
Târgu Bujor

Communes
Bălăbănești
Bălășești
Băleni
Băneasa
Barcea
Berești-Meria
Brăhășești
Braniștea
Buciumeni
Cavadinești
Cerțești
Corni
Corod
Cosmești
Costache Negri
Cuca
Cudalbi
Cuza Vodă
Drăgănești
Drăgușeni
Fârțănești
Foltești
Frumușița
Fundeni
Ghidigeni
Gohor
Grivița
Independența
Ivești
Jorăști
Liești
Măstăcani
Matca
Movileni
Munteni
Nămoloasa
Negrilești
Nicorești
Oancea
Pechea
Piscu
Poiana
Priponești
Rădești
Rediu
Scânteiești
Schela
Șendreni
Slobozia Conachi
Smârdan
Smulți
Suceveni
Suhurlui
Țepu
Tudor Vladimirescu
Tulucești
Umbrărești
Valea Mărului
Vânători
Vârlezi
Vlădești

See also
Administrative divisions of Romania
2010 Romanian floods

References

External links
 "Consiliul Județului Galați" County administration webpage in Romanian
 "Galați Online"  Viitorul portal gălățean

 
Counties of Romania
Geography of Western Moldavia
1968 establishments in Romania
States and territories established in 1968